The 2015 STP 500 was a NASCAR Sprint Cup Series race held on March 29, 2015, at Martinsville Speedway in Ridgeway, Virginia. Contested over 500 laps on the  paperclip shaped short track, it was the sixth race of the 2015 NASCAR Sprint Cup Series season. Denny Hamlin won the race while Brad Keselowski finished runner-up. Joey Logano, Matt Kenseth and David Ragan rounded out the top five.

Joey Logano won the pole for the race and led 91 laps on his way to a third-place finish. Kevin Harvick led the most laps – leading 154 – on his way to an eighth-place finish, ending an eight consecutive race streak of finishing first or second. The race had 31 lead changes among 13 different drivers, as well as 16 caution flag periods for 112 laps.

Hamlin's 25th career victory was his fifth win at Martinsville Speedway and the eighth at the track for Joe Gibbs Racing. The win moved Hamlin up to eighth in the points standings, which were still headed by Harvick; he left Martinsville with a 24-point lead over Logano. Despite being the winning manufacturer, Toyota still trailed Chevrolet by 37 points in the manufacturers' standings, in third place.

The STP 500 was carried by Fox Sports on the cable/satellite Fox Sports 1 network for the American television audience – the first scheduled points race to air on the channel. The radio broadcast for the race was carried by the Motor Racing Network and Sirius XM NASCAR Radio.

Report

Background

Martinsville Speedway is an International Speedway Corporation-owned NASCAR stock car racing track located in Henry County, in Ridgeway, Virginia, just to the south of Martinsville. At  in length, it is the shortest track in the NASCAR Sprint Cup Series. The track was also one of the first paved oval tracks in NASCAR, being built in 1947 by H. Clay Earles. It is also the only remaining race track that has been on the NASCAR circuit from its beginning in 1948.

Kevin Harvick entered Martinsville with a 28-point lead over Joey Logano following his eighth consecutive top-two finish, while Martin Truex Jr. entered 33 points back in third. Dale Earnhardt Jr. entered 61 points back in fourth, a point ahead of Brad Keselowski in fifth.

Changes to the track
Following the lead of other tracks in the wake of Kyle Busch's wreck in the previous month's Xfinity Series Alert Today Florida 300 at Daytona International Speedway, Martinsville Speedway president Clay Campbell announced that tire barrier packs would be installed at the end of the backstretch inside wall prior to the entrance of pit road, for "the continued safety of the drivers and our fans".

Tire reduction
For the race weekend at Martinsville, NASCAR reduced the number of tire sets that Sprint Cup teams were allotted, from eleven to ten. Martinsville was the first of several races in 2015 to have a reduction in tire sets, as a cost-cutting measure, with tire sets costing teams up to two thousand dollars.

Entry list
The entry list for the STP 500 was released on Thursday, March 19, 2015, at 1:47 p.m. Eastern time. Forty-six cars were entered for the race. All but four were entered for the previous week's race at Auto Club Speedway. Defending Xfinity Series champion Chase Elliott was entered to make his first career Sprint Cup Series start in the No. 25 Hendrick Motorsports Chevrolet. After The Motorsports Group opted not to enter the three race West-Coast swing, Ron Hornaday Jr. entered the race in the No. 30 Chevrolet. Alex Kennedy drove the No. 33 Hillman-Circle Sport LLC Chevrolet that had been driven by Brian Scott the previous race. Brett Moffitt was entered to drive the No. 34 Front Row Motorsports Ford, but he drove the No. 55 Michael Waltrip Racing Toyota, replacing Brian Vickers, who was ruled out for the next three months because of blood clots. Chris Buescher drove the No. 34 car in replacement of Moffitt. The No. 44 Team Xtreme Racing Chevrolet was entered for the race and was to be driven by Travis Kvapil. However, the team withdrew from the race on Friday, March 27. Team owner John Cohen stated that "with the threat of rain and our position in the points, we made the decision to channel our resources towards racing at Texas Motor Speedway in two weeks" and that "our crew is hard at work and our focus remains on qualifying into races each week".

First practice
Elliott told reporters that the Sprint Cup Series "is a different world" and that "we're happy to be here". Late in the session, Austin Dillon's car went up in smoke, due to a fluid leak.

Qualifying

Logano explained to reporters that he joked with his crew chief Todd Gordon about how many laps he could cover in the final session of qualifying; he stated that he "ran six and I told Todd I can't hold my breath any more than that so that's the fastest I can go", Ryan Newman joined Logano on the front row, but lamented the fact that he was not closer to Logano, stating that he "could have been just a tick quicker and gotten that pole", while also looking towards the race and the importance of pit stops during it.

Jimmie Johnson was also "excited" about his Hendrick Motorsports car, while qualifying fifth on the grid. He also elaborated that the car had "been real fast" and that "to have the car here starting in the top five with this much speed on Friday is awesome". Matt Kenseth qualified eighth, describing his first run as "okay", before further explaining that his car's "balance was pretty good and we were a little loose", and that "we just could never really get it any better on older tires". Chase Elliott qualified 27th on speed, and thus, ensured his place in the field for his maiden Sprint Cup Series start; he described the result as "definitely a big relief for us" and that he and his team were "excited for Sunday". Kurt Busch, the defending race winner, qualified just in front of Elliott, in 26th position. He described his car as "tight on corner exit" and that "it was like the rear end was planted too well". Brendan Gaughan and Ron Hornaday Jr. failed to qualify for the race.

Qualifying results

Practice (post-qualifying)

Second practice
Thirty minutes into the session, Jimmie Johnson started reporting that his car was having engine issues, but upon further inspection, it turned out to be a minor electrical issue. When he went back out, Johnson reported that there were "no issues".

Final practice
Greg Biffle made contact with the wall exiting turn 4 20 minutes into the session, causing cosmetic damage to his car; he returned to the track after minor repairs.

Prior to the race

On Saturday before the race, Kyle Larson was taken to a local hospital after fainting. John Olguin, vice-president of communications for Chip Ganassi Racing told Jim Utter of The Charlotte Observer that Larson suffered a fainting spell during an autograph session and was taken to the infield care center. Doctors at the care center advised that he go to a local hospital for further evaluation. While he checked out well by the hospital, Larson was sent to the Carolina Medical Center in Charlotte, North Carolina to be evaluated by a neurologist. On raceday morning, Chip Ganassi Racing announced that Larson was not medically cleared to race and that Regan Smith would drive in his place. As Larson qualified the car on Friday, his Chase eligibility was unaffected. With the driver change, Smith started from the rear of the field for the race.

Race

First-half

Start
The race was scheduled to start at 1:13 p.m., but started five minutes later when Joey Logano led the field to the green flag. The first caution flew on lap 11 when Trevor Bayne spun out in turn 1. His left-rear tire got cut down after contact with Alex Bowman in turn 3. The race restarted on lap 17 with Logano still leading the field. On the following lap, Ryan Newman – in the outside lane – took the lead from Logano, but Logano eventually retook the lead on lap 20. The second caution flew on lap 22 when Ricky Stenhouse Jr. got loose in turn 3, spun out, and lightly rear-ended the wall.

The race restarted on lap 27 when Matt Kenseth, trapped on the outside line, nearly spun out in turn 3 trying to go underneath Jeff Gordon. The third caution flew on lap 54 when J. J. Yeley hit the wall in turn 1, after contact with Denny Hamlin caused his left-front tire to deflate. A. J. Allmendinger dropped to the tail end of the field for speeding on pit road as did Aric Almirola. The race restarted on lap 61. In a classic Martinsville accordion effect, Brett Moffitt crashed into the rear of Chase Elliott. Moffitt was forced to pit to remove the hood of his car, that was flapping. This brought out the fourth caution of the race. Elliott did not pit instantaneously, but took his car to the garage. Dale Earnhardt Jr. gave up fifth place to pit under the caution.

The race restarted on lap 82. The fifth caution flew on lap 94 when Alex Kennedy spun out in turn 4 after making contact with Matt DiBenedetto. Earnhardt Jr. came onto pit road before it was open apparently to fix something inside his car; he radioed to his team that he "lost the gear shifter". Martin Truex Jr. stayed out to take the lead with Danica Patrick and Landon Cassill doing likewise, while Mike Bliss dropped to the tail end for speeding on pit road.

Second quarter mark
The race restarted on lap 101. The field was log-jammed by Cassill and Patrick until Patrick got bumped by Cassill. This allowed Logano to get under Cassill and send him and Patrick backwards down the field. He caught Truex Jr. and passed him with ease to retake the lead on lap 121. By lap 128, Logano caught the tail end of the field to start the lapping process. Kevin Harvick jumped underneath Logano to take the lead on lap 135. Hamlin got under Harvick in turn 1 to retake the lead on lap 149. Around lap 150, Allmendinger's engine began smoking and there were reports that he was putting down oil on the track, but it ultimately turned out to be a left-front tire rub. Jimmie Johnson – an eight-time Martinsville winner – went a lap down on lap 161. This was compounded by the sixth caution on lap 163, which came out when Stenhouse Jr. spun in turn 4; so Casey Mears got the free pass as the first car a lap down, just ahead of Johnson.

Hamlin and Harvick swapped the lead on pit road and Harvick exited with the lead. Hamlin was forced to drop to the tail end of the field along with Allmendinger for an uncontrolled tire on pit road. Other pit penalties were levied to Kasey Kahne, who dropped to the rear for speeding, and Earnhardt, who dropped to the rear for having too many men over the wall. The race restarted on lap 172 and Brad Keselowski got the best restart to take the lead on lap 173. Eventually, Harvick powered by on the inside to take back the lead before losing it to his teammate Kurt Busch on lap 176. The seventh caution flew on lap 183 for debris in turn 4, which turned out to be a plastic grill plate from one of the Ford cars.

The race restarted on lap 189 with Busch in the lead, before Harvick retook the lead on lap 196. The eighth caution flew on lap 206 when Stenhouse Jr. hit the wall again in turn 3. Harvick and Logano swapped the lead on pit road and Harvick exited first. Justin Allgaier was held a lap for pitting outside his pit box, while Paul Menard dropped to the rear for speeding on pit road. For the second consecutive caution, Earnhardt Jr. dropped to the rear for too many men over the wall again. Kahne stayed out to take the lead, ahead of the restart on lap 216. The ninth caution flew on lap 219 when Michael Annett got loose in turn 2, and made contact with Logano, spinning both drivers out.

The race restarted on lap 225. The tenth caution of the race flew on lap 228 for a multi-car wreck in turn 1; it began with an accordion effect of Menard slowing down to avoid hitting someone, only for Earnhardt Jr. to rear-end him. Allgaier, Mears, David Ragan, and Cole Whitt were also caught in the incident. Drivers slowed down to try to avoid the initial contact between Ragan and Mears, but were unable to do so and the wreck followed. Earnhardt stated that he was unsure "why they stopped down there in the corner" and that he "knocked the radiator out" of his car.

Second-half

Halfway
The race restarted on lap 239 and as Kahne was on old tires, he was no match for Harvick's newer rubber as he took the lead on lap 240. The eleventh caution flew on lap 269 when Allgaier hit the wall. Carl Edwards took the lead under caution, ahead of the restart on lap 285. Harvick took the lead back just before the twelfth caution flew for a multi-car wreck in turn 3, which began when Busch turned into Regan Smith, caving in his car's nose. Annett cut down through the patch of grass after being bumped in the rear by Trevor Bayne and got into Ryan Newman.

The race restarted on lap 295 with Harvick in the lead. Keselowski took the lead back on lap 303 and led for the next few laps, before catching lapped cars at the wrong spot and lost the lead to Hamlin on lap 317. Harvick got underneath Hamlin to retake the lead on lap 328, and he maintained the lead until the thirteenth caution flew on lap 354 when Annett hit the wall in turn 1. With his pit stall being behind the start/finish line, Harvick swapped the lead with Kenseth on pit road, but Harvick returned to the track in the lead for the restart on lap 364. The fourteenth caution of the race flew on lap 367 when Menard got loose entering turn 3, and got turned around by Logano in turn 4. His spin delayed Almirola, Bayne, and Greg Biffle.

Fourth quarter

The race restarted with 127 laps to go. Busch changed lanes before the start/finish line and was ordered to serve a pass-through penalty. His crew chief Tony Gibson requested a review of the call and the penalty was rescinded. This was due to the fact that Busch was supposed to be lined up on the inside for the restart. Hamlin took back the lead with 101 laps to go. The fifteenth caution flew with 69 laps to go when Edwards spun out in turn 4 after a right-rear puncture. Kenseth led a lap with Hamlin pitting behind the start/finish line and maintained the lead at the culmination of the stops. Busch dropped to the rear for having too many men over the wall on pit road and Earnhardt Jr. dropped to the rear for speeding on pit road. The race restarted with 61 laps to go, and Gordon took the lead for the first time with 59 laps to go. Debris on the front stretch brought out the sixteenth caution of the race with 40 to go. Kenseth exited pit road first, but Tony Stewart stayed out to take the lead. Gordon was caught speeding on pit road and dropped to the rear of the field. After the race, Gordon was "disappointed" in regards to the speeding violation and that he "felt like [they] finally got the car, got [their]selves in a position to win that race".

The race restarted with 34 laps to go. Kenseth took the lead with 29 laps to go, before ceding the lead to Hamlin a couple of laps later. Hamlin retained the lead for the remainder of the race and despite a last turn bump by Keselowski, he achieved his fifth Martinsville win in the Sprint Cup Series.

Post-race

Driver comments
In victory lane, Hamlin stated that he and his team "just weren't going to be denied today", while also praising Keselowski for not wrecking him coming off the final turn. Keselowski stated that he "just felt like [I] raced him the way [he] wanted to be raced", amid criticism for not pursuing the victory. An eighth-place finish ended Harvick's Top 2 finishing streak at eight races. Harvick expressed that he "just got hung on the outside and couldn't get back down" and that he "just lost track position at the wrong time". Patrick's seventh-place finish tied her with Janet Guthrie for the most top 10 finishes in the Sprint Cup Series by a female driver with five.

Race results

Race statistics
31 lead changes among 13 different drivers
16 cautions for 112 laps
Time of race: 3 hours, 49 minutes, 13 seconds
Average speed: 
Denny Hamlin took home $172,260 in winnings

Race awards
 Coors Light Pole Award: Joey Logano (19.232)
 3M Lap Leader: Kevin Harvick (154 laps)
 American Ethanol Green Flag Restart Award: Kevin Harvick (20.519)
 Duralast Brakes "Bake In The Race" Award: Kevin Harvick
 Freescale "Wide Open": Joey Logano
 Ingersoll Rand Power Move: Kurt Busch, 5 positions
 MAHLE Clevite Engine Builder of the Race: Roush-Yates Engines, #22
 Mobil 1 Driver of the Race: Denny Hamlin (134.9 driver rating)
 Moog Steering and Suspension Problem Solver of The Race: David Ragan (crew chief Adam Stevens 0.129 seconds)
 NASCAR Sprint Cup Leader Bonus: No winner: rolls over to $30,000 at next event
 Sherwin-Williams Fastest Lap: Denny Hamlin (Lap 66: 19.662)
 Sunoco Rookie of The Race''': Brett Moffitt

Media

Television
Fox Sports covered their fifteenth race at Martinsville Speedway. This was also the first scheduled points race aired on Fox Sports 1. FS1 had previously carried the rain-delayed 2014 Food City 500 as well as the exhibition 2014 NASCAR Sprint All-Star Race. Mike Joy, Larry McReynolds and eleven-time Martinsville race winner Darrell Waltrip had the call in the booth for the race. Jamie Little, Chris Neville and Matt Yocum handled the pit road duties for the television side.

Radio
MRN had the radio call for the race, which was also simulcasted on Sirius XM NASCAR Radio. Joe Moore, Jeff Striegle and seven time Martinsville winner Rusty Wallace called the race in the booth when the field was racing down the front stretch. Dave Moody called the race from the Bill France Tower stands in turn 3 when the field was racing down the backstretch. Alex Hayden, Winston Kelley and Steve Post worked pit road for MRN.

Standings after the race

Drivers' Championship standings

Manufacturers' Championship standings

Note: Only the first sixteen positions are included for the driver standings.

Notes

References

STP 500
STP 500
NASCAR races at Martinsville Speedway